Gwalia Male Choir (Welsh: Côr Meibion Gwalia) is a male voice choir based in London. Founded in 1967, it is one of London's oldest male choirs. Gwalia is an archaic Welsh name for Wales.

It meets and rehearses every week in the London Welsh Centre. This building is a cultural and community center, officially opened in 1930 by Margaret Lloyd George, wife of former prime minister David Lloyd George.

The honorary President of the choir is singer, songwriter, author and broadcaster Cerys Matthews. In 2017 she succeeded BAFTA award-winning Welsh journalist, newsreader and presenter Huw Edwards in the role.

Performances 

Since its founding, the choir has regularly performed in venues such as the Houses of Parliament, the Foreign Office, the National Liberal Club, St Paul's Cathedral, the Ritz Hotel, the Royal Albert Hall and many of the places of worship in the List of Christopher Wren churches in London. The choir has performed at the Millennium Stadium in Cardiff.  Choir members sang as part of the closing ceremony of the 2012 London Olympic Games. The choir has toured widely in Europe, most recently in Lombardy, Italy.

The choir appeared on the 1973 album Back Into The Future by Welsh psychedelic/progressive rock band Man (band). They also appear on the Chris De Burgh album Beautiful Dreams and have performed live on the Robert Elms show on BBC Radio London as part of Saint David's Day celebrations. On 15 August 2015 they took part in a Drumhead Service on Horse Guards Parade in Central London to mark the 70th Anniversary of VJ Day. The service was attended by veterans of the conflict and also by Prince Charles, The Duchess of Cornwall, and Prime Minister David Cameron.

Repertoire 

The choir's repertoire is largely drawn from the Welsh tradition, but also includes more popular pieces, including songs from musicals and operas.

Notables 

Notable former members include the conductor/arranger and current Musical Director for the Welsh Rugby Union Dr. Haydn James and the former Member of Parliament for Monmouth Huw (William Edmund) Edwards.

London choirs